Armando Sosa Peña (born 1 March 1989), known as Mandi, is a Spanish professional footballer who plays as a defensive midfielder for Unionistas de Salamanca CF.

Career
Born in Santa Lucía de Tirajana, Canary Islands, Mandi made his debut as a senior with UD Vecindario in 2007. In the summer of 2008 he moved to Villarreal CF, representing both its C and B teams.

On 2 February 2010, Mandi joined SD Ponferradina on loan until June. With the Castile and León club he was promoted to Segunda División, being regularly used during his six-month spell.

On 15 July 2010, after rejecting a new contract at Ponfe, Mandi signed for Real Madrid Castilla also in the third division. After again winning promotion to the second tier, he moved to Sporting de Gijón on 22 June 2012 after agreeing to a four-year deal.

Mandi made his professional debut on 2 September 2012, starting in a 0–0 away draw against Racing de Santander. He scored his first goal on 5 January of the following year, in a 1–1 draw at Recreativo de Huelva.

On 31 August 2015, Mandi terminated his contract with Sporting and signed for Elche CF just hours later. On 8 July 2017, after suffering relegation with the latter, he agreed to a one-year deal at UD Almería.

On 12 October 2018, Mandi signed with New Zealand club Wellington Phoenix FC. He scored his first goal in the A-League on 24 November, with a long-range half-volley to open a 3–1 home loss against Adelaide United FC.

Mandi joined Indian Super League franchise ATK on 16 December 2019, as a replacement for the injured Carl McHugh. After contributing eight starts as they were crowned champions, he returned to his country's division three with Unionistas de Salamanca CF.

Honours
Real Madrid Castilla
Segunda División B: 2011–12

ATK
Indian Super League: 2019–20

References

External links

1989 births
Living people
Spanish footballers
Footballers from the Canary Islands
Association football midfielders
Segunda División players
Segunda División B players
Tercera División players
Primera Federación players
UD Vecindario players
Villarreal CF C players
Villarreal CF B players
SD Ponferradina players
Real Madrid Castilla footballers
Sporting de Gijón players
Elche CF players
UD Almería players
Unionistas de Salamanca CF players
A-League Men players
Wellington Phoenix FC players
Indian Super League players
ATK (football club) players
Spanish expatriate footballers
Expatriate association footballers in New Zealand
Expatriate footballers in India
Spanish expatriate sportspeople in New Zealand
Spanish expatriate sportspeople in India